The 2010–11 KML season was the 87th season of top-tier basketball in Estonia. It is sponsored by G4S and thus officially known as the G4S Korvpalli Meistriliiga. Defending champions were TÜ/Rock.

Team information

Regular season 

Source: 2010/2011 Alexela Korvpalli Meistriliiga põhiturniir

Play-offs

Awards

Finals MVP
  Armands Šķēle – Kalev/Cramo

Best Young Player
  Rain Veideman – TÜ/Rock

Coach of the Year
  Aivar Kuusmaa – Kalev/Cramo

All-KML team

References

External links 
 G4S Korvpalli Meistriliiga (Hooaeg: 2010/2011)

Korvpalli Meistriliiga seasons
Estonian
KML